Thoradonta is an Asian genus of ground-hoppers (Orthoptera: Caelifera) and typical of the tribe Thoradontini.

This genus contains species distributed from India to southern China, Indo-China, Malesia through to New Guinea.

Species 
The  Orthoptera Species File and Catalogue of Life list:
Thoradonta apiculata Hancock, 1915
Thoradonta aspinosa Ingrisch, 2001
Thoradonta bengalensis Shishodia, 1991
Thoradonta butlini Blackith & Blackith, 1987
Thoradonta centropleura Podgornaya, 1994
Thoradonta dentata Hancock, 1909 - type species
Thoradonta dianguiensis Deng, Zheng & Wei, 2006
Thoradonta lancangensis Zheng, 1991
Thoradonta lativertexoides Zha & Kang, 2016
Thoradonta lativertex Günther, 1938
Thoradonta longipenna Zheng & Liang, 1991
Thoradonta longispina Zheng & Xie, 2005
Thoradonta nigrodorsalis Zheng & Liang, 1991
Thoradonta nodulosa Stål, 1861
Thoradonta novaeguineae Tumbrinck, 2018
Thoradonta obtusilobata Zheng, 1996
Thoradonta palawanica Günther, 1938
Thoradonta spiculoba Hancock, 1912
Thoradonta spiculobaoides Zha & Kang, 2016
Thoradonta spinata Hancock, 1909
Thoradonta spinata Hancock, 1909
Thoradonta subtruncata Gupta, Shi & Chandra, 2018
Thoradonta transspicula Zheng, 1996
Thoradonta varispina Zha & Sheng, 2016
Thoradonta yunnana Zheng, 1983

References

External links 
 

Tetrigidae
Caelifera genera
Orthoptera of Asia